Bridgehaugh Park is a rugby union ground in Stirling, Scotland, with a capacity of approximately 4,000.

It is the home of Stirling County RFC, who currently play in the Scottish Premiership.

Location

It is situated in a meander of the River Forth in the north of the city of Stirling. Close to the river, it is very close to the site of the Battle of Stirling Bridge, a battle famously fought by Andrew Moray and William Wallace.

It lies about 1 km north of the city centre.

Uses

Home to Stirling County RFC, it also hosts matches by Bridgehaugh RFC. It is used intermittently by Glasgow Warriors usually for friendly matches. It is also used by the Scotland Women's rugby team. and Scotland Men's matches at age grade.

References

Rugby union stadiums in Scotland
Rugby union in Stirling